Jo Carrillo is a professor of law at the University of California, Hastings. She is a scholar and an educator. Carrillo has been awarded many honors within the disciplines of scholarly work on property and material property systems, financial intimate partner violence, consumer protection issues, and legal humanities. These honors include the Chip Robertson Scholarly Publications Fund Award, The Outstanding Mentor Award to American Indian, Alaska Native, and Native Hawaiian Students, The Roger J. Trainer Scholarly Publication Award, a Mediator Certification, an Outstanding Service and Achievement Award, and Hastings Research Chair.

Carrillo received her B.A. in undergraduate studies from Stanford University, she received her J.D. in law from the University of New Mexico, and her J.S.D in law from Stanford Law School.

Jo Carrillo is also a contributor to This Bridge Called My Back, a collections of writings by Radical Women of Color.

Bibliography 
 Readings in American Indian Law (1998, Temple University Press)
 Understanding California Community Property Law (2015, LexisNexis)

References

University of California, Hastings faculty
Living people
Year of birth missing (living people)